Thomas Bere (1652 – 22 June 1725) of Huntsham, near Tiverton, in Devon, was an English landowner and Whig politician who sat in the English and British House of Commons in two periods between 1690 and 1725.

Early life
Bere was the eldest son of Thomas Bere, lord of the manor of Huntsham, Devon, by his first wife Margaret Davie, daughter of Sir John Davie, 1st Baronet.  He matriculated at Exeter College, Oxford on 4 March 1670. He succeeded to Huntsham on the death of his father in 1680. In about 1686, he married  Mary Stedman, widow of George Stedman of Midsomer Norton, Somerset and daughter of Robert Lang of Stanton Prior, Dorset.

Political career
Bere  was elected unopposed as Whig Member of Parliament  for Tiverton,  at the 1690 English general election. He presented  a petition to Parliament   from Tiverton on 8 January 1692 complaining about Irish woollen manufacture, which was taking away many Devon workers. He was returned unopposed again for Tiverton at the 1695 English general election and signed the Association in February 1696  and voted tofix the price of guineas at 22 shillings in March. He was returned unopposed at the 1698 English general election, at the two general elections of 1701 and at the 1702 English general election, being involved mainly in small private bills. At the 1705 English general election, he was again returned unopposed as a Whig and voted for the Court candidate for speaker on 25 October 1705. After supporting the Court over the ‘place clause’ of the regency bill, he was appointed Commissioner for victualling the navy in 1706, holding the post for the rest of his life. At the 1710 British general election he was caught up in a triple return for Tiverton, and after the poll was declared void, he lost the seat at a by-election.

Bere was returned unopposed as MP for Tiverton at the general elections of 1715 and 1722, and retained the seat until his death.

Death and legacy
Bere died on 22 June 1725 leaving two sons.

References

1652 births
1725 deaths
Alumni of Exeter College, Oxford
People from Mid Devon District
Whig (British political party) MPs for English constituencies
English MPs 1690–1695
English MPs 1695–1698
English MPs 1698–1700
English MPs 1701
English MPs 1701–1702
English MPs 1702–1705
English MPs 1705–1707
British MPs 1707–1708
British MPs 1708–1710
British MPs 1715–1722
British MPs 1722–1727
Whig members of the pre-1707 English Parliament